The situation of human rights in Central Asia varies little between the region's countries, but are often reported to be a cause of concern among many outsider observers, governmental and non-governmental. Some of the legacy of human rights in the region derives from its history as part of the Soviet Union.

Regions
See the following for more details on each country:
Afghanistan
China
Kazakhstan
Kyrgyzstan
Mongolia
Pakistan
Russia
Tajikistan
Turkmenistan
Uzbekistan

See also
Human rights in East Asia
Human rights in Europe
Human rights in the United Kingdom
Human rights in the United States

External links
Pro-Democracy Groups Are Harassed in Central Asia New York Times. Dec. 3, 2005.  
World Observes International Mine Awareness and Assistance Day Central Asia Health Review. Apr. 5,2008
Record Breaking Winter Weather Hits Children in Tajikistan the Hardest Central Asia Health Review. Feb.17, 2008
New Directions Post-Independence from the Dean Peter Krogh Foreign Affairs Digital Archives
{Eng/Rus}«Human Rights in Central Asia»
IPHR. The website of International Partnership for Human Rights (IPHR) contains a number of publications on current human rights issues in Central Asia.

Human rights by region
Central Asia